Aleksandr Arkadyevich Bondar (born 21 November  1967) is a Russian professional football official and a former player.

Club career
He made his debut in the Soviet Top League in 1991 for FC Dynamo Moscow. He played 1 game for FC Spartak Moscow in the European Cup Winners' Cup 1992–93 (in a winning quarterfinal return leg against Feyenoord).

Honours
 Russian Premier League champion: 1993.
 Russian Cup finalist: 1995.

References

1967 births
Footballers from Saxony-Anhalt
Sportspeople from Magdeburg
German people of Russian descent
Living people
Russian footballers
Soviet footballers
Association football midfielders
Association football defenders
FC Akhmat Grozny players
FC Rostov players
FC Dynamo Moscow players
FC Spartak Moscow players
Maccabi Yavne F.C. players
FC Dynamo Stavropol players
FC Rotor Volgograd players
FC Volgar Astrakhan players
Russian Premier League players
Russian expatriate footballers
Expatriate footballers in Israel
Russian expatriate sportspeople in Israel